Bert Crowfoot (born in Gleichen, Alberta) is a Canadian journalist, photographer and TV producer of Siksika & Saulteaux descent.

In 1983, Bert began publishing Windspeaker, a national magazine covering issues in the aboriginal community and he is the founder and CEO of the Aboriginal Multimedia Society of Alberta.

He established Alberta's first Aboriginal radio station, CFWE-FM, and he is the producer of the documentary series Quest of Buffalo Spirit.

He is the great-great-grandson of legendary Blackfoot chief Crowfoot.

References

External links
 Bert Crowfoot Photography
 AAMSA

1954 births
Living people
20th-century First Nations people
21st-century First Nations people
Canadian documentary film producers
Film directors from Alberta
First Nations filmmakers
First Nations journalists
First Nations photographers
Ojibwe people
Saulteaux people